The Charles W. Shaver House is a historic house at the northeast corner of Court and Spring Streets in Evening Shade, Arkansas.  It is a single-story brick structure, with an L-shaped configuration that has gable roofs.  Built in 1874, it is distinctive as a rare brick postbellum 19th century house in the community, and as the home of Charles W. Shaver, a son of the one of the city's founders, John W. Shaver.  Shaver, despite being a wheelchair user, was a successful local merchant who thrived during the American Civil War, in part by crossing military lines to acquire needed supplies for the community.  The use of Greek Revival elements (an entablature and gable end returns, for example) in the house was a trend-setter in later home construction in the community.

The house was listed on the National Register of Historic Places in 1982.

See also
John W. Shaver House, 1854 home of Charles W. Shaver's father
National Register of Historic Places listings in Sharp County, Arkansas

References

Houses on the National Register of Historic Places in Arkansas
Houses completed in 1874
Houses in Sharp County, Arkansas
National Register of Historic Places in Sharp County, Arkansas